Thiophene-2-carboxylic acid is an organic compound with the formula SC4H3CO2H.  It is one of two monocarboxylic acids of thiophene, the other being thiophene-3-carboxylic acid.  Copper(I) thiophene-2-carboxylate is a catalyst for Ullmann coupling reactions.

Synthesis
It can be prepared by the oxidation of thiophene-2-carboxaldehyde or, more practically, 2-acetylthiophene.

Applications and reactions

Upon treatment with LDA, thiophene-2-carboxylic acid undergoes double deprotonation to give the 5-lithio derivative, a precursor to many 5-substituted derivatives.

Thiophene-2-carboxylic acid has been widely studied as a substrate in coupling reactions and olefinations.

References

Thiophenes
Carboxylic acids